Walter Janssen (7 February 1887 – 1 January 1976) was a German film actor and director. He appeared in more than 160 films between 1917 and 1970.

Selected filmography

 The Dancer (1919)
 Destiny (1921)
 Wandering Souls (1921)
 Island of the Dead (1921)
 Peter the Great (1922)
 What Belongs to Darkness (1922)
 Lust for Life (1922)
 Carousel (1923)
 La Boheme (1923)
 The Love of a Queen (1923)
 Shadows of the Metropolis (1925)
 Tragedy (1925)
 The Great Duchess (1926)
 Fräulein Mama (1926)
 Only a Dancing Girl (1926)
 Sword and Shield (1926)
 Women of Passion (1926)
 The House of Lies (1926)
 The Queen of Spades (1927)
 The Little Slave (1928)
 It's You I Have Loved (1929)
 The Night Belongs to Us (1929)
 Black Forest Girl (1929)
 The White Roses of Ravensberg (1929)
 The Flute Concert of Sanssouci (1930)
 The Singing City (1930)
 Two Hearts in Waltz Time (1930)
 The Woman Without Nerves (1930)
 The Great Longing (1930)
 Yorck (1931)
 The Emperor's Sweetheart (1931)
 Everyone Asks for Erika (1931)
 The Concert (1931)
 Queen of the Night (1931)
 The Black Forest Girl (1933)
 Ways to a Good Marriage (1933)
 Laughing Heirs (1933)
 The Hymn of Leuthen (1933)
 Maskerade (1934)
 Master of the World (1934)
 Every Day Isn't Sunday (1935)
 The Old and the Young King (1935)
 Fräulein Veronika (1936)
 The Accusing Song (1936)
 Family Parade (1936)
 Serenade (1937)
 Red Orchids (1938)
 Mistake of the Heart (1939)
 Passion (1940)
 The Comedians (1941)
 Attack on Baku (1942)
 Whom the Gods Love (1942)
 Beloved World (1942)
 Diesel (1942)
 Heaven, We Inherit a Castle (1943)
 The Big Number (1943)
 The War of the Oxen (1943)
 The Wedding Hotel (1944)
 Why Are You Lying, Elisabeth? (1944)
 Young Hearts (1944)
  The Time with You (1948)
 Everything Will Be Better in the Morning (1948)
 Trouble Backstairs (1949)
 The Appeal to Conscience (1949)
 The Blue Straw Hat (1949)
 Chased by the Devil (1950)
  Scandal at the Embassy (1950)
  Who Is This That I Love? (1950)
 The Cloister of Martins (1951)
 Illusion in a Minor Key (1952)
  Behind Monastery Walls (1952)
 The Mine Foreman (1952)
  Captive Soul (1952)
  I Can't Marry Them All (1952)
 The Colourful Dream (1952)
 Street Serenade (1953)
  Must We Get Divorced? (1953)
 The Chaplain of San Lorenzo (1953)
 Your Heart Is My Homeland (1953)
 The Poacher (1953)
  Everything for Father (1953)
 The Mosquito (1954)
 Hubertus Castle (1954)
  Homesick for Germany (1954)
 Three from Variety (1954)
 The Cornet (1956)
 The Vulture Wally (1956)
 The King of Bernina (1957)
 War of the Maidens (1957)
 Voyage to Italy, Complete with Love (1958)
 Old Heidelberg (1959)
 Every Day Isn't Sunday (1959)
 Something for Everyone (1970)

References

External links

1887 births
1976 deaths
20th-century German male actors
German male film actors
German male silent film actors